This list contains the names of Japanese dissidents in Imperial Japan, which lasted from the Meiji period (1868-1912) to the end of World War II. The list includes, but not limited to, communists, anarchists, and religious dissidents.

A 
Kazuo Aoyama, a communist

D 
Taisen Deshimaru, a buddhist teacher

H 
Teru Hasegawa, an esperantist

I 
Shoichi Ichikawa, a Japanese Communist Party member
Yuki Ikeda 
Ayako Ishigaki, a journalist
Noe Itō

K 
Wataru Kaji, a writer
Shigeo Kamiyama, a Japanese Communist Party member
Fumiko Kaneko, a pre-Shōwa period assassin
Sen Katayama, founding member of the Japanese Communist Party
Takiji Kobayashi, an author of proletarian literature
Shūsui Kōtoku, a Japanese anarchist
Tokuda Kyuichi

M 
Tsunesaburō Makiguchi, Soka Gakkai member
Kenji Miyamoto, Japanese Communist Party member

N 
Daisuke Namba, pre-Shōwa period assassin
Eitaro Noro, Japanese Communist Party member
Sanzo Nosaka, Japanese Communist Party leader

O 
George Ohsawa, pacifist
Shigeki Oka, socialist
Sakae Ōsugi, anarchist

S 
Yoshio Shiga

T 
Jōsei Toda, Soka Gakkai member
Makoto Tomioka, anarchist

Y 
Mitsu Yashima, artist, and wife of Taro Yashima
Taro Yashima, artist

See also
Japanese dissidence during the Shōwa period

Dissidents in Imperial Japan